Zotov is a rural locality (a khutor) in Khopyoropionerskoye Rural Settlement, Uryupinsky District, Volgograd Oblast, Russia. The population was 33 as of 2010.

Geography 
Zotov is located 61 km northeast of Uryupinsk (the district's administrative centre) by road. Kriushinsky is the nearest rural locality.

References 

Rural localities in Uryupinsky District